Organized football in Saint Pierre and Miquelon has been reported since at least 1964, when the Coupe du Territoire was held. The tournament was played regularly until the Ligue de Football de Saint Pierre et Miquelon was formed in 1976. The league has been played every season since 1976.

Below is the list of champions each year on the island territory where available.

Coupe du Territoire 

 1964 : AS Ilienne Amateur
 1965 : AS Ilienne Amateur
 1966 : AS Ilienne Amateur
 1967 : AS Ilienne Amateur
 1968 : AS Ilienne Amateur
 1969 : AS Ilienne Amateur
 1970 : AS Ilienne Amateur
 1971 : AS Ilienne Amateur
 1972 : AS Saint-Pierraise
 1973 : AS Ilienne Amateur
 1974 : AS Ilienne Amateur
 1975 : AS Ilienne Amateur

Ligue 
 1976 : AS Ilienne Amateur
 1977 : AS Ilienne Amateur
 1978 : AS Ilienne Amateur
 1979 : AS Ilienne Amateur
 1980 : AS Ilienne Amateur
 1981 : AS Ilienne Amateur
 1982 : AS Ilienne Amateur
 1983 : AS Ilienne Amateur
 1984 : AS Ilienne Amateur
 1985 : AS Ilienne Amateur
 1986 : AS Ilienne Amateur
 1987 : AS Ilienne Amateur 
 1988 : AS Saint-Pierraise 
 1989 : AS Ilienne Amateur
 1990 : AS Ilienne Amateur
 1991 : AS Ilienne Amateur
 1992 : AS Saint-Pierraise
 1993 : AS Saint-Pierraise
 1994 : AS Saint-Pierraise
 1995 :   unknown
 1996 : AS Ilienne Amateur
 1997 :   unknown
 1998 :   unknown
 1999 :   unknown
 2000 :   unknown
 2001 : AS Saint-Pierraise
 2002 : AS Ilienne Amateur
 2003 : AS Ilienne Amateur
 2004 : AS Ilienne Amateur
 2005 : AS Miquelonnaise  
 2006 :   unknown
 2007 : AS Saint-Pierraise
 2008 : AS Miquelonnaise
 2009 :   unknown
 2010 : AS Ilienne Amateur
 2011 : AS Ilienne Amateur
 2012 : AS Ilienne Amateur
 2013 : AS Ilienne Amateur
 2014 :   not known
 2015 : AS Saint-Pierraise
 2016 : AS Saint-Pierraise

See also 
 Football in Saint Pierre and Miquelon
 Ligue de Football de Saint Pierre et Miquelon

References 

Champions
National association football champions
Football champions